Squalius lepidus, also known as the Mesopotamian pike chub, is a species of ray-finned fish in the family Cyprinidae. It is found in the Tigris-Euphrates basin.

References

Squalius
Fish described in 1843